Total Access Communication System (TACS) and ETACS are variants of Advanced Mobile Phone System (AMPS) which were announced as the choice for the first two UK national cellular systems in February 1983, less than a year after the UK government announced the T&Cs for the two competing mobile phone networks in June 1982. This 1G technology is now obsolete.

History
Vodafone (known then as Racal-Vodafone) opted for a £30 million turnkey contract from Ericsson (ERA) to design, build and set up its initial network of 100 base station sites.

Cellnet (then known Telecom Securicor Cellular Radio Ltd) used development labs in the facilities at General Electric (later made part of Motorola) based at Lynchburg, Virginia, United States. The reason Cellnet used the General Electric labs was because the AMPS system was already in development there, and the company had set up a production facility in readiness for AMPS production in 1985 which the Cellnet TACS was to share. In March 1984 development of prototypes began at General Electric. Production began in 1985 and General Electric produced 20,000 systems that year for Cellnet's distribution in the UK. Production of what was to become the Motorola model were then made at Stotfold, Bedfordshire, England. This production facility continued making TACS until the advent of GSM.

TACS cellular phones were used in Europe (including the UK, Italy, Austria and Ireland) and other countries. TACS was also used in Japan under the name Japanese Total Access Communication (JTAC). It was also used in Hong Kong. ETACS was an extended version of TACS with more channels.

TACS and ETACS are now obsolete in Europe, having been replaced by the GSM (Global System for Mobile Communications) system. In the United Kingdom, the last ETACS service operated by Vodafone was discontinued on 31 May 2001, after 16 years of service. The competing service in the UK operated by Cellnet (latterly BT Cellnet) was closed on Sunday 1 October 2000.

Eircell (now Vodafone Ireland) closed its TACS network on 26 January 2001. This followed a long period during which customers were encouraged to switch to GSM services. When the network was closed, there were very few, if any, active TACS customers left. Customers who switched network were able to keep their phone number, but the (088) prefix was changed to either 087 (Eircell, now Vodafone Ireland) GSM or 086 (Esat Digifone, which became O2 Ireland before merging with Three) GSM. At the time, full mobile number portability was not available to TACS customers and the (088) prefix was closed. An automatic voice message was left in place for 12 months advising callers of the customer's new prefix.

Frequency bands used by ETACS in the UK 

TACS BAND Summary

ESNs were issued in batches of 65535 by BABT for phone manufactures to program into each cellular phone to make each one unique to the TACS network with which it attempted to register.

The following countries had more than two batches of ESNs allocated to them: UK, Italy, Austria, China, Malaysia, Hong Kong, Singapore, Bahrain, UAE, Kuwait, Philippines, Sri Lanka, Australia.

UK ETACS and US AMPS compared

Commercial deployments

References

History of telecommunications
History of mobile telecommunications in the United Kingdom
Mobile radio telephone systems